Lizzie McGuire is the soundtrack to the television series of the same name. The album is a collection of hits by various artists, used as background music in the show or inspired by it. It also includes the show's theme song and a song by Hilary Duff, the actress who plays Lizzie. This was Hilary's music debut. It has sold 1,000,000 copies in the U.S and was certified Platinum by the RIAA. The album's single, "I Can't Wait" was serviced to radio on August 12.

Track listing
 "I Can't Wait" - Hilary Duff 
 "Why Can't We Be Friends?" - Smash Mouth 
 "All I Can Do" - Jump5
 "Us Against the World" - Play 
 "Irresistible" - Jessica Simpson 
 "ABC" - Jackson 5 
 "Everybody Wants Ya" - S Club 7 
 "Start the Commotion" - The Wiseguys 
 "Walk Me Home" - Mandy Moore
 "What They Gonna Think" - Fan 3
 "Have a Nice Life" - Dana Dawson
 "We'll Figure It Out (Theme Song)" - Angie Jaree

Charts

Weekly charts

Year-end charts

Certifications

References

External links
 Lizzie McGuire TV Show Soundtrack - Walt Disney Records

Soundtrack
Television soundtracks
2002 soundtrack albums
Walt Disney Records soundtracks